Frederick Douglass is a public artwork in front of the Hornbake Library at the University of Maryland in College Park, Maryland. The statue memorializes African-American abolitionist, suffragist, and labor leader Frederick Douglass.

Description and history
Unveiled in 2015, the statue was designed by sculptor Andrew Edwards, who was inspired by artwork representing then-president Barack Obama and Moses. The statue portrays Douglass in the middle of a speech, with one arm outstretched, and a copy of his autobiography under the other arm. The square surrounding the statue features stone pavers and a vertical Corten steel wall with Douglass's words inscribed on them. The cast bronze statue was designed in Ireland and cast in Wales. It stands on a 3-foot-tall base and weighs nearly half a ton. Kenneth B. Morris, Jr., Douglass's great-great-great-grandson, said that "I love that the statue shows him in his fiery abolitionist years."

The statue was the result of years of efforts on the part of campus leaders to honor this important Marylander and to reaffirm commitment to social justice. History professor Ira Berlin was part of this group, who called themselves the North Stars after the abolitionist newspaper Douglass edited. According to Berlin, "The vision of myself and the North Stars was to have Frederick Douglass on campus to speak to the question of social justice." Efforts to raise the more than half a million dollars for the square and the statue began in 2011. The statue itself cost $200,000.

References

2015 sculptures
Cultural depictions of Frederick Douglass
Douglass
Douglass
Douglass
Bronze sculptures in Maryland
Monuments and memorials in Maryland
University of Maryland, College Park
2015 establishments in Maryland
Douglass